Trughanacmy is a barony in County Kerry, Ireland. The barony is an obsolete administrative area, having ceased to have any government function since the enactment of the Local Government (Ireland) Act 1898.

Name
The name of the barony was derived from the Irish Triocha Chead an Aicme Chiarraighe, or "Barony of the Ciarraige". The Ciarraighe, or "people of Ciar" were the pre-Gaelic tribe who lived in area, and who gave their name to the county.

Parishes
The barony contained the whole or part of twenty-one civil parishes:
Annagh (part)
Ardfert (part: Ardfert Village is in the Barony of Clanmaurice)
Ballincuslane
Ballymacelligott
Ballynahaglish
Ballyseedy
Brosna
Castleisland
Clogherbrien
Currans (part)
Dysert
Fenit
Kilcolman (part)
Kilgarrylander
Kileentierna (part)
Killorglin (part)
Kiltallagh
Nohaval
O'Brennan
Ratass
Tralee

References

External links
 Records Online for Co. Kerry, Ireland
 GENUKI - Kerry, Baronies

Baronies of County Kerry